Euplax dagohoyi is a species of crab in the family Macrophthalmidae. It was described by Mendoza & Ng in 2007.

References

Ocypodoidea
Crustaceans described in 2007